Tord Bernhard Hagen (19 January 1914 – 2008) was a Swedish diplomat and ambassador.

Biography

Early life and education
Tord Bernhard Hagen was known to his friends as Bill, a nickname given to him as a young student in Uppsala. He lost his father early and his mother Ellen Hagen raised him and his sister Helga while pursuing a career in politics.

Career
After graduating from Uppsala University, Bill went on to pursue a career as a diplomat by joining the Swedish Ministry for Foreign Affairs. His first deployment was at the Swedish embassy in London where he directly experienced the outbreak of World War II and the subsequent German bombings. He served as an attaché at the embassy from April 1939 to 1943. He also spent a few months in 1939 as substitute to the general counsel in Dublin.

Bill would continue his career by spending the majority of his life abroad. In the forties and fifties he served at the Swedish legations in Ankara, Prague and Bonn. In Prague, he experienced the rise of communist influence in Eastern Europe and in Bonn he saw the development of Western European cooperation.

His first position as ambassador came when Bill was offered to head the installation of a new embassy in Bangkok. He spent five years in Southeast Asia from 1959 to 1964 as ambassador of Thailand, also overseeing Cambodia, Burma and Vietnam. Bill then spent two years working at the ministry's headquarters in Stockholm before taking over the position as ambassador of Egypt in Cairo, where he also oversaw Sudan and Somalia. In Egypt Bill experienced several turbulent incidents such as the Six-Day War and the assassination of prime minister Wasfi al-Tal of Jordan. After six years in Cairo (1966–72) Bill and the family returned to Europe where Bill served as ambassador to the Netherlands 1972-77 and ambassador to Denmark 1977–80.

Despite retiring from the Ministry for Foreign Affairs in 1980 Bill continued working as he was appointed senior advisor to Volvo International where he spent several years working in Geneva and also made extensive travels to the Middle East.

After ending his assignment at Volvo Bill began penning his memoirs which resulted in the book Ett liv i krig och fred (A life in war and peace) which was published in 2000.

In June 1995 Bill appeared in the BBC documentary Myths and memories of World War 2 discussing the potential peace-treaty between England and Germany in 1940.

Marriage and children
In 1944 and 1946 Bill and his first wife Lena saw the birth of their children Robert and Cecilia. Bill married his second wife Inga in 1966 and their son Bernhard was born in 1969.

Death and afterward
Bill died quietly in his home in March 2008 at the age of 94.

References

1914 births
2008 deaths
Ambassadors of Sweden to Thailand
Ambassadors of Sweden to Myanmar
Ambassadors of Sweden to Vietnam
Ambassadors of Sweden to Cambodia
Ambassadors of Sweden to Egypt
Ambassadors of Sweden to Sudan
Ambassadors of Sweden to Somalia
Ambassadors of Sweden to the Netherlands
Ambassadors of Sweden to Denmark
People from Uppsala
Uppsala University alumni
Burials at Uppsala old cemetery
Commanders Crosses of the Order of Merit of the Federal Republic of Germany